Prabodh Kumar Bhowmick is an Indian anthropologist based on West Bengal. His notable work on the Lodha tribe of West Bengal.

References

Indian anthropologists
1926 births
2003 deaths